Sigbjørn Skåden (born 8 July 1976) is a Sámi and Norwegian poet and novelist.

Career
Skåden published five books on the Sami publishing house Skániid Girjie; the poetry collections Skuovvadeddjiid gonagas (2004), Skomakernes konge (2007) and Prekariáhta lávlla (2009); and the novel Ihpil: Láhppon mánáid bestejeaddji (2008). For his debut, he was nominated to the Nordic Council Literature Prize, representing the Sami language area.

In 2012 he issued the young adult non-fiction Sámit/Samer on Cappelen Damm. He then issued the novels on Cappelen Damm, Våke over dem som sover (2014) and Fugl (2019). The first of these novels was nominated for the NRK P2 Listeners' Prize.

Fugl has been called the first science fiction novel by a Sámi author. Skåden himself has described it as his most Sámi work so far, and it has been interpreted as an allegory of the loss of Sámi culture due to forced assimilation and Norwegianization of the Sámi people.

Personal life
Hailing from Planterhaug in Skånland, he resides in Tromsø.

References

1976 births
Living people
People from Troms
Norwegian poets
Norwegian novelists
Sámi-language writers